Vertigo is a genus of minute, air-breathing land snails, terrestrial pulmonate gastropod molluscs or micromollusks in the family Vertiginidae, the whorl snails.

Description
Snails in the genus Vertigo have no oral tentacles, thus they have only one pair of tentacles.

The jaw is arched; the ends squarely truncated; the anterior surface striate; the cutting edge with a median projection. The radula has a central tooth that is almost square, tricuspid, as large as or larger than the lateral teeth, which are similar, narrower, and bi- or tricuspid. The marginal teeth are low, wide and serrated.

Shell
The shell is deeply rimate and ovate. The apex is acuminate and obtuse. The shell has 5–6 whorls. The last whorl is rounded. The aperture is semioval with 4 to 7 folds. The peristome is scarcely expanded and white-lipped.

Distribution 
The distribution of the genus Vertigo includes Europe, northern Asia, eastern Asia, Japan, Central and North America, Caribbean and the Bermudas.

Species

Species in the genus Vertigo include:
 
 Vertigo alabamensis G. Clapp, 1915 – Alabama Vertigo
 Vertigo alpestris Alder, 1838 – tundra vertigo
 † Vertigo angulifera O. Boettger, 1884 
 Vertigo angustior Jeffreys, 1830 – Narrow-mouthed Whorl Snail
 Vertigo antipygmaea Harzhauser & Neubauer, 2018 
 Vertigo antivertigo (Draparnaud, 1801)
 Vertigo arctica (Wallenberg, 1858)
 † Vertigo arenula (C. A. White, 1876) 
 Vertigo arizonensis Pilsbry & Vanatta, 1900
 Vertigo arthuri Von Martens, 1882
 †Vertigo atavuncula (C. A. White, 1883) 
 † Vertigo bakonyensis Kókay, 2006 
 Vertigo bandulana (Connolly, 1922)
 † Vertigo bella Y.-T. Li, 1986 
 Vertigo beringia Nekola, Chiba, Coles, Drost, Proschwitz & Horsák, 2018
 Vertigo bermudensis Pilsbry, 1919
 Vertigo berryi Pilsbry, 1919
 † Vertigo bicolumellata Steklov in Steklov & Tsytovich, 1967 
 † Vertigo bifida (Deshayes, 1863) 
 Vertigo binneyana Sterki, 1890
 Vertigo bisulcata (Jickeli, 1873)
 Vertigo bollesiana (Morse, 1865) – Delicate vertigo snail
 † Vertigo brusinai De Stefani, 1880 
 Vertigo calamitosa (Pilsbry, 1889)
 Vertigo californica (Rowell, 1862)
 † Vertigo callosa Reuss in Reuss & Meyer, 1849 
 Vertigo catalinaria (Sterki, 1890)
 Vertigo chiricahuensis Nekola, Chiba, Coles, Drost, Proschwitz & Horsák, 2018
 Vertigo chytryi Nekola, Chiba, Coles, Drost, Proschwitz & Horsák, 2018
 † Vertigo cianfanellianus (Manganelli, Benocci, Esu & Fo. Giusti, 2008) 
 Vertigo circumlabiata Schileyko, 1984
 Vertigo clappi Brooks & G. R. Hunt, 1936
 Vertigo clementina (Sterki, 1890)
 Vertigo coloradensis (Cockerell, 1891)
 Vertigo columbiana'' Sterki, 1892
 Vertigo congoensis (Dartevelle, 1952)
 † Vertigo consteniusi Pierce in Pierce & Constenius, 2001 
 Vertigo conecuhensis G. Clapp, 1915: synonym of Vertigo alabamensis G. H. Clapp, 1915
 Vertigo cristata (Sterki, 1919)
 Vertigo cupressicola Sterki, 1919
 Vertigo dalliana (Sterki, 1890)
 Vertigo dedecora (Pilsbry, 1902)
 † Vertigo defranceii (Brongniart, 1810) 
 Vertigo diegoensis (Sterki, 1890)
 † Vertigo diversidens (Sandberger, 1872)
 † Vertigo doliara Pierce in Pierce & Constenius, 2001 
 † Vertigo douvillei de Morgan, 1920 
 † Vertigo elsheimensis O. Boettger, 1889 
 Vertigo eogea Pilsbry, 1919
 Vertigo eogea stagnalis Kuroda, 1941
 Vertigo extima (Westerlund, 1877)
 Vertigo farquhari (Pilsbry, 1917)
 Vertigo genesii (Gredler, 1856) – Round-mouthed Whorl Snail
 Vertigo genesioides Nekola, Chiba, Coles, Drost, Proschwitz & Horsák, 2018
 Vertigo geyeri Lindholm, 1925
 Vertigo gittenbergeri (Hausdorf, 2008)
 † Vertigo globosa Sacco, 1886 
 Vertigo gouldii (Binney, 1843)
 Vertigo griqualandica (Melvill & Ponsonby, 1893)
 Vertigo hannai Pilsbry, 1919
  † Vertigo hauchecornei Klebs, 1886
 Vertigo hebardi Vanetta, 1912
 Vertigo hemphilli (Sterki, 1890)
 † Vertigo hibbardi F. C. Baker, 1938 
 Vertigo hinkleyi Pilsbry, 1921
 Vertigo hirasei Pilsbry, 1901
 † Vertigo hohenstaufenorum Schlickum & Geissert, 1980 
 Vertigo hydrophila (Reinhardt, 1877)
 Vertigo idahoensis Pilsbry, 1934
 Vertigo inserta Pilsbry, 1919
 Vertigo japonica Pilsbry & Y. Hirase, 1904
 † Vertigo kochi O. Boettger, 1889 
 Vertigo kodamai Nekola, Chiba, Coles, Drost, Proschwitz & Horsák, 2018
 † Vertigo kroloppi Schlickum & Strauch, 1979 
 † Vertigo kuenowii Klebs, 1886
 Vertigo kurilensis Nekola, Chiba, Coles, Drost, Proschwitz & Horsák, 2018
 Vertigo kushiroensis Pilsbry & Y. Hirase, 1905
 Vertigo kushiroensis botanicorum Horsak & Pokryszko, 2010
 † Vertigo likharevi Prysjazhnjuk, 1978
 Vertigo lilljeborgi (Westerlund, 1871)
 † Vertigo lozeki Schlickum & Puisségur, 1978 
 † Vertigo luminosa Y.-T. Li, 1986 
 Vertigo malleata Coles & Nekola, 2007
 † Vertigo manchurica K. Suzuki, 194 
 Vertigo marciae Nekola & Rosenberg, 2013
 Vertigo marki Gulick, 1904
 † Vertigo maxillosa Schütt, 1994 
 Vertigo meramecensis A. S. Van Devender, 1979
 † Vertigo micra Pierce in Pierce & Constenius, 2001 
 Vertigo microsphaera Schileyko, 1984
 Vertigo milium (Gould, 1840) – Blade Vertigo
 † Vertigo milleri Gottschick & Wenz, 1919
  † Vertigo minor O. Boettger, 1870 
 Vertigo modesta (Say, 1824) – cross vertigo
 †Vertigo moedlingensis Wenz & Edlauer, 1942 
 † Vertigo moenana Zinndorf, 1901 
 † Vertigo moldavica Prisyazhnyuk, 1973 
 Vertigo morsei Sterki, 1894
 † Vertigo mostrata Y.-T. Li, 1986 
 Vertigo moulinsiana (Dupuy, 1849) – Desmoulin's whorl snail
 † Vertigo myrmido Michaud, 1855 
 Vertigo nangaparbatensis Pokryszko & Hlaváč, 2009
 Vertigo nitidula (Mousson, 1876)
 † Vertigo nouleti Michaud, 1862 
 Vertigo numellata Gulick, 1904
 Vertigo nylanderi Sterki, 1909
 † Vertigo obesa Y.-T. Li, 1986 
 Vertigo occidentalis Sterki, 1907
 † Vertigo ocsensis (Halaváts, 1903) 
 Vertigo okinoerabuensis Pilsbry & Hirase, 1904
 † Vertigo olchonica Popova & Schileyko, 1981 
 Vertigo oralis Sterki, 1890 – Palmetto Vertigo
 Vertigo oscariana Sterki, 1890 – Capital Vertigo
 Vertigo oughtoni Pilsbry, 1948
 Vertigo ovata (Say, 1822) – ovate vertigo
 † Vertigo ovatula (Sandberger, 1875) 
 † Vertigo pageti Schlickum & Strauch, 1979 
 † Vertigo palangula (De Boissy, 1848) 
 † Vertigo pandei Bhatia & Mathur, 1971 
 Vertigo parcedentata (A. Braun, 1847)
 Vertigo parvula Sterki, 1890
 Vertigo perryi Sterki, 1905
 Vertigo pimuensis Nekola, Chiba, Coles, Drost, Proschwitz & Horsák, 2018
 Vertigo pisewensis Nekola, Chiba, Coles, Drost, Proschwitz & Horsák, 2018
 † Vertigo pontileviensis de Morgan, 1920 
 † Vertigo praecoquis Russell, 1956
 † Vertigo praepusilla Prysjazhnjuk, 1978 
 † Vertigo protracta (Sandberger, 1875) 
 † Vertigo pseudoantivertigo Paladilhe, 1873 
 Vertigo pseudosubstriata Ložek, 1954
 Vertigo pusilla O. F. Müller, 1774 – type species
 Vertigo pygmaea (Draparnaud, 1801) – crested vertigo
 Vertigo ronnebyensis (Westerlund, 1871)
 Vertigo rowellii (Newcomb, 1860)
 Vertigo rugosula Sterki, 1890 – Striate Vertigo
 Vertigo sandbergeri Wenz, 1923 †
 Vertigo seminulum (R. T. Lowe, 1852)
 Vertigo sterkii Pilsbry, 1919
 Vertigo substriata (Jeffreys, 1833)
 Vertigo superstriata Pokryszko & Auffenberg, 2009
 † Vertigo tembrockae Schlickum & Strauch, 1979 
 Vertigo teskeyae Hubricht, 1961
 † Vertigo tewarii Bhatia & Mathur, 1971 
 Vertigo torrei Aguayo & Jaume, 1934
 Vertigo tridentata Wolf, 1870
 Vertigo trinotata (Sterki, 1890)
 † Vertigo trolli Wenz in K. Fischer & Wenz, 1914
 † Vertigo tuchoricensis Pilsbry in Pilsbry & C. M. Cooke, 1919 
 † Vertigo turonica de Morgan, 1920 
 Vertigo ultima Pilsbry, 1919
 Vertigo ultimathule Proschwitz, 2007
 † Vertigo uncata Steklov, 1967 
 Vertigo utahensis Sterki, 1892
 † Vertigo vectiensis L. R. Cox, 1924 
 Vertigo ventricosa (E. S. Morse, 1865)
 † Vertigo vracevicensis Neubauer & Harzhauser in Neubauer et al., 2017 
 † Vertigo whitei Pierce in Pierce & Rasmussen, 1992

Synonyms
 Vertigo concinnula (Roscoe and Roscoe, 1955) – Mitered vertigo: synonym of Vertigo modesta concinnula Cockerell, 1897
 Vertigo cubana Crosse, 1890: synonym of Lyropupa cubana (Dall, 1890)
 Vertigo elatior (Brooks, 1936) – tapered vertigo: synonym of Vertigo ventricosa (Morse, 1865)
 † Vertigo flexidens (Reuss, 1861): synonym of † Ptychalaea flexidens (Reuss, 1861) 
 Vertigo hachijoensis Pilsbry, 1919: synonym of Vertigo kushiroensis hachijoensis Pilsbry, 1919
 Vertigo heldi Clessin, 1877: synonym of Vertigo pygmaea (Draparnaud, 1801)
 Vertigo hubrichti Pilsbry, 1934: synonym of Vertigo arthuri E. von Martens, 1882
 † Vertigo interferens (Deshayes, 1863) : synonym of † Ovicarychium interferens (Deshayes, 1863)
  † Vertigo mystica (Stworzewicz & Pokryszko, 2015): synonym of † Ptychalaea mystica Stworzewicz & B.M. Pokryszko, 2015 
 Vertigo neglecta Arango in Poey, 1856: synonym of Vertigo ovata Say, 1822
 Vertigo occulta Vanetta, 1912: synonym of Vertigo arthuri E. von Martens, 1882
 †Vertigo paradoxa Sterki in Pilsbry, 1900: synonym of Vertigo arthuri E. von Martens, 1882
 Vertigo shimochii Kuroda & Amano, 1960: synonym of Gastrocopta servilis (A. Gould, 1843)
 Vertigo sieversi (O. Boettger, 1879): synonym of Vertigo nitidula (Mousson, 1876)

References
This article incorporates public domain text from reference.

Further reading
 Speight M. C. D., Moorkens E. A. & Falkner G. (2003). Proceedings of the workshop on conservation biology of European Vertigo species.
 Myzyk S. (2005). "Egg structure of some vertiginid species (Gastropoda: Pulmonata: Vertiginidae)". Folia Malacologica'' 13: 169. (open access with registration required)

External links

 gallery of selected Vertigo species
 https://www.biolib.cz/en/taxon/id2689

Vertiginidae
 
Gastropod genera
Taxa named by Otto Friedrich Müller